Bradford, England is an ethnically and culturally diverse city. The City of Bradford metropolitan borough is the sixth most populous local authority district in the United Kingdom, and includes not only Bradford but also the towns and villages of Keighley, Shipley, Bingley, Ilkley, Haworth, Silsden, Queensbury, Thornton and Denholme.

Built-up area
It is a subdivision of the West Yorkshire Built-up Area.

Population

The City of Bradford's total population, according to the 2011 UK census, was 522,452. The population density was 1,428 people per square km.

Ethnicity

The following table shows the ethnic group of respondents in the 1991, 2001 and 2011 censuses in the City of Bradford. 

Bradford has had a significant Pakistani population since post war migration began however in recent decades since the ethnicity question was first added in 1991 has the group saw massive growth in proportional size. In 1991, they made up nearly 10% of the city rising to 20.4% in 2011 in two decades. This increase in Pakistanis has generally provided the majority of the growth of the multi-ethnic group of Asian British people within the city however other groups such as Other Asians and Bangladeshi's have also increased, in 1991 Asian British people made up 13.8% of the city rising to just above a quarter (26.8%) in 2011. White British people have declined from above three quarters of the population in 2001 (76.1%) to below two thirds in 2011 (63.9%) in coincide with the decrease of White's overall from 84.4% to 67.4%. Black British people have been in fluctuation, in 1991 they accounted for 1.1%, declining to 0.9% in 2001 then rising again to 1.8% with the majority of the increase coming from Black Africans. Other groups such as Other ethnicities and Mixed people have also increased since 2001. 

Notes for table above

Ethnicity of school pupils 

The ethnicity of school pupils within Bradford has been in flux, with the native White British population declining from a majority of 61.7% in 2004 to a minority of 40.1% of the total school pupil population. This shift has turned Bradford's schools into a majority-minority state, where there are no overall majorities. Asian British school children have risen from 33.1% of the school pupil population to a stagnate 42.7% in 2022, having declined the previous two years from 43.1% in 2020. The largest group within this multi-ethnic amalgamation is British Pakistanis at 36.4% of the total school population. Black British school pupils have risen slightly from 1% to 1.9% with the majority of growth coming from Black Africans. Other groups such as Other ethnicities, Other Whites and Mixed people have also increased as well.

Languages

The most common main languages spoken in the City of Bradford according to the 2011 census are shown below.

Religion

The following table shows the religion of respondents in the 2001, 2011 and 2021 censuses in the City of Bradford.

Industry 

Manufacturing in Bradford has collapsed since the middle half of the 20th century.

See also

Demography of West Yorkshire
Demography of the United Kingdom
Demography of England
Demography of London
Demography of Birmingham
Demography of Greater Manchester
List of English cities by population
List of English districts by population
List of English districts and their ethnic composition
List of English districts by area
List of English districts by population density

References

Bradford
Bradford